Bible translations into Indigenous Australian languages date back to the 1800s, when missionaries translated the Bible into several Aboriginal languages. The practice has continued into the 20th and 21st centuries, with Australian Kriol becoming the first Australian language to have a complete Bible translation (completed in 2019).

By language
Currently, 54 Indigenous Australian languages, including two creoles and Plain English (intended to be easy for non-native English speakers in Indigenous Australian communities to understand). Several have a complete New Testament, but only one (Kriol) has a complete Bible with both the Old and New Testaments.

Aboriginal languages

Torres Strait Islander languages

References

Australian Aboriginal languages
Australian